The Kentucky & Indiana Bridge is one of the first multi modal bridges to cross the Ohio River. It is for both railway and common roadway purposes together. By federal, state, and local law railway and streetcar, wagon-way, and pedestrian modes of travel were intended by the City of New Albany, City of Louisville, State of Kentucky, State of Indiana, the United States Congress, and the bridge owners.  The K & I Bridge connects Louisville, Kentucky to New Albany, Indiana. Constructed from 1881 to 1885 by the Kentucky and Indiana Bridge Company, the original K&I Bridge opened in 1886. It included a single standard gauge track and two wagon ways, allowing wagons and other animal powered vehicles to cross the Ohio River by a method other than ferry for the first time. At the time motorized vehicles were virtually nonexistent. The K&I Bridge company also owned a ferry boat operation during both the 1st and 2nd bridge; eventually that operation was sold as the bridge's success largely outmoded boat usage.

Original bridge

Purpose of the Kentucky and Indiana Bridge
The Kentucky & Indiana Bridge, which spans the mighty Ohio River at the Falls of the Ohio, was designed to connect the cities of New Albany, Indiana and Louisville, Kentucky, and to bring their residents closer together. Citizens of New Albany and Louisville who conceived the bridge described its purpose in Articles of Association for the Kentucky and Indiana Bridge Company filed with the Recorder of Floyd County, Indiana March 7, 1881. The bridge founders declared, the object and purpose of the Kentucky & Indiana Bridge Company is to construct, own, and operate a bridge from a point in the City of New Albany, Indiana across the Ohio River to a point in the City of Louisville, Kentucky for both railway and common roadway purposes together..

Source of funds
This bridge and its approaches cost $1,500,000 and is a monument to the enterprising citizens of Louisville and New Albany, who devised and carried out the financial plans for its erection. It is adapted for railway, streetcar, wagon-way, and pedestrian travel.

Alignment with the national heritage of the United States
The alignment of the K & I is along America's ancient roads known as the Great Buffalo Trace and Wilderness Road. Early Americans crossed at the limestone and coral rapids for 8,000 years. This strategic location has the only waterfall cascade on the 1,000 mile Ohio & Mississippi River. The location of the K & I is of enormous historic and sentimental importance and reflects the pioneer roots in our national destiny. America can commemorate the eighteenth-century migration of hundreds of thousands of settlers into Kentucky and Indiana via the Buffalo Traces by reopening the footpath across the Kentucky and Indiana Bridge. Today, some 48 million Americans have ancestors who moved through the Cumberland Gap and into Kentucky and Indiana along these pioneer trails.

In Louisville, this route offered the most rapid connection to U.S. Highway 150 or Dixie Highway heading southwest and Lexington Road heading southwest. In Indiana between Vincennes and New Albany, the road follows the original route of the Buffalo Trace.

Public right of way
Each level of government, federal, state, and city, preserved their right of way and established speed limits across the Kentucky and Indiana Bridge. In doing that, Louisville city leaders also mandated that the purpose of the bridge was for four modes of transportation: railroad, streetcar, vehicle, and pedestrian purposes. The City of Louisville and Federal Government also declared the Kentucky and Indiana Bridge a postal route and retained its right of way in perpetuity.

Safety in design
Designer Mace Moulton, Member of the American Society of Civil Engineers, highlighted the K & I Bridge design, which included thoughtful safety innovations at the National Conference of the American Society of Civil Engineers in 1887. He chose the best Ohio River location in Louisville across the Falls of the Ohio, where it has the least width. This gave residents of New Albany and Louisville a shorter and independent entrance to their cities.

The railroad track was placed in the center between two trusses; one roadway on the outside of each truss, supported upon projecting brackets, and the sidewalks on either side of the railroad track and inside the main trusses. Designers used high visual screens along the roadway - to calm horses, livestock, and to keep drivers focused on the roadway and not distracted by trains.

On both the Louisville and New Albany sides, the common roadway and railway tracks are grade separated or completely independent.

Publicity for opening
Publicity for the opening of the Kentucky and Indiana bridge was substantial as even the Library of the United States Congress joined in advertising the grand opening of the  bridge. They wrote "There is in the course of construction at this time (1885), and about completed, a bridge across the Ohio, between Louisville and New Albany, Indiana. The bridge at Louisville is to have a railroad track, a passageway for the vehicles, streetcars, and a walk-way for foot passengers".

Safety of the common roadway in use
Kentucky & Indiana Bridge had a remarkable safety rating. Experts at the time ranked it among the safest of any major bridge in the United States. This was due to the narrow roadway lanes, which induce slow driving speed and grade-separated crossings which kept the trains and roads on different vertical elevations where the road and rail routes crossed. The K & I Bridge Board of Directors reported, "The common roadway has been operated with remarkable freedom from accidents. The few that have  occurred have been of trivial character with no loss of life or limb to any person.

Light rail
Upon opening, the bridge company also offered the Daisy Line, an early steam locomotive commuter train service. In 1893, the Daisy Line trains became electrified, the first steam to electric conversion in the U.S.  This train was subject of feature articles in technical journals and was pictured in "Engineering News". Louisville's heavy rail electrification even preceded the electrification of the famous Chicago's 'L' trains by two years.

Passengers traveled in multi-unit three-car elevated electric trains from 1st, 4th and 7th Street elevated stations and other stations en route between Louisville and New Albany. This rapid transit service was wildly popular, with its 15-minute service and convenient schedules from 6am to midnight, ridership soared exponentially from day one. By 1906 a ridership survey found 3,425 commuter passengers crossing daily and 1,250,000 passengers per year, crossing the K&I Bridge on these rapid electric trains. Even by modern standards this would be considered a heavily used line.

Expenditures made for replacing wooden bridge railings and retrofitting west Louisville wooden el segments with steel, resulted in receivership for the Kentucky and Indiana Bridge Company. The company reorganized in 1899 now renamed the Kentucky and Indiana Bridge and Railroad Company. There was no interruption of the electric commuter train or other bridge heavy rail, line hauled freight and passenger trains.

In late 1907, the K&I Bridge and Railroad Co sold its commuter train equipment to another company, completely exiting the commuter rail business. By spring of 1908, the elevated west Louisville, the downtown Louisville elevated trackage and elevated stations were no longer used.

In March 1908 the new operator changed all of the equipment gauge, making crossings via a broad gauge gauntlet track over the bridge, with a down ramp immediately afterward, to connect to  Louisville's  gauge streetcar tracks. The 1908 version of service was essentially converted to trolleys including single car runs, but two car trains were retained for rush hour to meet the heavy patronage and ridership expectations built up over the decades.

Replacement bridge

In 1910 the bridge company was renamed the Kentucky & Indiana Terminal Railroad Co. From 1910 to 1912, a new, heavier bridge was built on new piers just upstream from the original one, after which the old bridge was demolished. The new bridge was double tracked to handle increasingly heavier train and now automobile traffic, eventually receiving the U.S. 31W designation.

The bridge also featured a rotating swing span opening for the passage of ships in high water. The bridge was only opened four times, twice for testing in 1913 and 1915, then in 1916 for the passage of the steamer "Tarascon" and in 1920 for passage of the Australian convict ship "Success". In 1948 it refused opening of the span for passage of the steamer "Gordon C. Greene" citing inconvenience and costs of cutting power and communication lines, an action for which K&I and LG&E both paid damages to that ship's company. In 1955 the K&I sought and received permission to permanently tie down the swing span from the Corps of Engineers. In 1952, creosoted wood block roadways of the second bridge were eliminated and replaced by a steel gridwork roadway.

Roadway closure, proposed reopening

A quick survey promised to reopen the roadway, but automotive traffic was banned thereafter by the railroad.

Since that time, various groups have sought to reopen the vehicle lanes, either for motor vehicles or for pedestrians. In 2011 and 2012, the nearby Sherman Minton Bridge was closed when inspectors found cracks in some of the primary load-bearing parts of the superstructure, leading into inquiries into whether the K&I Bridge roadways could be reopened. The inquiries increased when news media saw trucks using the closed roadways. Norfolk Southern said that the trucks were used by their maintenance crews, and that the bridge is "unavailable for public use."

Proposals to turn the roadway lanes into pedestrian-only usage have also been rebuffed by Norfolk Southern, citing liability concerns. One proposal would include the K&I Bridge as part of a larger trail along the Ohio River, which would include the Big Four Bridge that was converted to pedestrian use between Louisville and Jeffersonville, Indiana.

Train fire
On June 30, 2014, a Norfolk Southern freight train crossing the bridge caught fire, closing the bridge for more than 17 hours and backing up traffic on NS lines as far away as Cincinnati, Ohio and Somerset, Kentucky. The fire took place in containers loaded with tea bags and children's toys. The fire was fought from both the bridge itself and from the river below the bridge. The train was eventually pulled off the bridge to fully contain the fire.

See also
List of crossings of the Ohio River

Notes

References
Kleber, John E.  Encyclopedia of Louisville. (University Press of Kentucky). pp. 460–461.

External links

The Building and History of the KITRR at Trainsweb
Kentucky and Indiana Terminal Bridge at Bridges & Tunnels

19th-century buildings and structures in Louisville, Kentucky
Bridges in Louisville, Kentucky
Buildings and structures in New Albany, Indiana
Bridges over the Ohio River
Bridges completed in 1885
Southern Railway (U.S.)
Baltimore and Ohio Railroad bridges
Chicago, Indianapolis and Louisville Railway
Norfolk Southern Railway bridges
Transportation buildings and structures in Floyd County, Indiana
Road-rail bridges in the United States
Road bridges in Indiana
Railroad bridges in Indiana
Road bridges in Kentucky
Railroad bridges in Kentucky
Former toll bridges in Indiana
Former toll bridges in Kentucky
U.S. Route 31
Steel bridges in the United States
1885 establishments in Kentucky
1885 establishments in Indiana